William Dwyer may refer to:

 William Dwyer (Irish politician) (1887–1951), Irish independent politician
 Bill Dwyer (mobster) (1883–1946), American Prohibition-era gangster
 Bil Dwyer (1907–1987), American cartoonist and humorist
 William Lee Dwyer (1929–2002), U.S. federal judge 
 Ubi Dwyer (Bill Dwyer, 1933–2001), Windsor Free Festival organiser
 Bil Dwyer (born 1962), American actor and comedian
 William A. Dwyer Jr. (1914–1982), American lawyer, judge, and politician from Philadelphia
 William Gerard Dwyer (born 1947), American mathematician
 Bill Dwyer (1887–1943), English comedian in the double act Clapham and Dwyer